Digitivalva hemiglypha is a moth of the  family Acrolepiidae. It is found in Japan (Kyushu).

The wingspan is 7–8 mm. The forewings are strongly marbled with pale yellowish. The hindwings are light grey or slaty-grey. Females are darker than males.

References

Acrolepiidae
Moths described in 1976
Moths of Japan